Azizur Rahman Akkas is a Bangladesh Awami League politician and the former Member of Parliament of Kushtia-1.

Career
Akkas was elected to parliament from Kushtia-1 as a Bangladesh Awami League candidate in 1973.

References

Awami League politicians
Living people
1st Jatiya Sangsad members
Year of birth missing (living people)
Bangladesh Krishak Sramik Awami League central committee members